Prethopalpus is a spider genus known as goblin spiders and are found in the Australasian tropics, including Nepal, India, Indonesia, Papua New Guinea and Australia. Three species are widely distributed, whereas the majority of species are recorded a single localities. Of the 41 species, 14 blind troglobite species live in subterranean ecosystems in Western Australia.

See also

Prethopalpus attenboroughi Baehr & Harvey, 2012: Queensland, Torres Strait
Prethopalpus maini Baehr & Harvey, 2012: Western Australia, Pilbara

References

Oonopidae
Araneomorphae genera
Spiders of Asia
Spiders of Australia